Jean-Louis Giasson (December 7, 1939 – February 12, 2014) was a Canadian Roman Catholic bishop.

Born in L'Islet-sur-Mer, Quebec, Canada, Giasson was ordained to the priesthood in 1965 with the Société des Missions-Étrangères in Laval, Quebec. Following his ordination, Giasson went to Honduras as a missionary in 1966 and in 2003 he became regional superior for the Society in Honduras.

Bishop of Yoro

In 2005 after 48 years as a priest, he was appointed by Pope Benedict XVI the first bishop of the Roman Catholic Diocese of Yoro, Honduras. He resigned on January 21, 2014 and died less than a month after retiring.

Notes

1939 births
2014 deaths
Canadian Roman Catholic missionaries
21st-century Roman Catholic bishops in Honduras
Roman Catholic bishops of Yoro